Cirencester College is a sixth form college based in the town of Cirencester in the South Cotswolds. It is a specialist sixth form provider serving communities in Gloucestershire, South Gloucestershire, Wiltshire and Oxfordshire. Cirencester College offers a wide choice of qualifications including A-levels, the new T-levels In addition to vocational training, the college has a good track-record of sending students on to higher education at a range of universities, apprenticeships and straight into employment. 

The principal is Jim Grant, a long-time servant of the college and published archaeologist.

History

Established as a Tertiary College in 1991, Cirencester College gained its Sixth Form status in November 2011, one of only three designated colleges in the South West. Cirencester College was awarded ‘Good' status in all six categories by Ofsted in 2018, as well as Beacon status in 2004.

Campus

The main campus is located half a mile from Cirencester town centre. In the last few years the College has undertaken a substantial building programme with a Sports Hall, multi classroom complex, STEM (Science, Technology, Engineering and Maths) building, and an Animal Centre which opened in September 2019. 

The Gloucestershire Digital Skills Centre opened in 2022 funded by GFirst, Gloucestershire’s Local Enterprise Partnership from the Government’s ‘Getting Building Fund’ programme. The Digital Skills Centre meets the needs of two of the fastest growing skill sectors in the UK by equipping students with up-to-date resources, equipment and skills needed to enter careers in both of those sectors. 

The College’s new T-level Building opens in February 2022 which provides specialist accommodation for T-level students in Engineering, Health, Construction, Finance, Early Years, Accounting and Business.

The college is the site of the 275-seater Sundial Theatre, which is used for both college events and drama classes as well as external performances from bands, theatre companies, comedians, and professional speakers.

Notable alumni

 Ellie Harrison - Journalist, and presenter of the BBC's CountryFile.
 Pete Reed - Three-time Olympic gold medallist rower.
 Phoebe Paterson Pine - British paralympian and archer.

References

External links
 Cirencester College Website
 Sundial Theatre Website

Cirencester
Further education colleges in Gloucestershire
Educational institutions established in 1991
Learning and Skills Beacons
1991 establishments in England